Rodney Barnes is an American screenwriter and producer. Barnes has written and produced The Boondocks, My Wife and Kids, Everybody Hates Chris, Those Who Can't, Marvel's Runaways, American Gods, Wu-Tang: An American Saga, and is currently an executive producer/writer on HBO's Winning Time: The Rise of the Lakers Dynasty.

He has also earned top honors for his work from the Peabody Awards, American Film Institute, Writers Guild of America, BET Comedy Awards, and NAACP Image Awards.

Early life

Rodney Barnes was born September 19 in Annapolis, Maryland. During his childhood he quickly gravitated to comic books, primarily superhero style, horror and science fiction. He attended Howard University in Washington, DC. In 1995, Barnes decided to move to Los Angeles to pursue his dream of screenwriting.

Career
Barnes was a producer and writer for the Damon Wayans show My Wife and Kids, from 2001 to 2005. He was then a co-executive producer and writer of Chris Rock’s TV series Everybody Hates Chris, from 2005 to 2009. He was also the co-executive producer of 'Til Death in 2010, and a consulting producer of Brothers in 2009.

After completing 4 seasons of the critically acclaimed animated comedy The Boondocks, where he served as executive producer and head writer from 2005 to 2014, he was a consulting producer on the TruTV sitcom Those Who Can't, co-executive producer for the second season of the Comedy Central animated sitcom Legends of Chamberlain Heights and co-executive producer for the unproduced second season of Vinyl for HBO. He then served as Co-Executive producer/Writer on Hulu's upcoming adaptation of Marvel's Runaways. In between he was nominated for writing special material by the Writers Guild of America for his work on the 88th Academy Awards, hosted by comedian Chris Rock.

Barnes then served as executive producer for the unproduced Starz drama Heels.  He has also been developing the animated series Vandaveon and Mike, based on characters created by and starring Keegan-Michael Key and Jordan Peele for Comedy Central, and "Killogy", a graphic novel series from creator Alan Robert.

In 2017, Barnes ventured into writing for his first love, comic books. He authored "Birth of a Patriot," a short story in Marvel Comics' Secret Empire spin-off "Brave New World" #2. He then penned the Falcon (comics) series for the Marvel Legacy Imprint, the mini-series "Lando: Double or Nothing" for Marvel/Lucasfilm based on the character Lando Calrissian from the Star Wars franchise, and is currently writing "Quincredible" for the Lion Forge imprint and "Killadelphia" for Image Comics.

As well, Barnes co-wrote the adaption of Arc of Justice, which is set to be produced/financed by the Mark Gordon Company, directed by José Padilha and starring Russell Crowe and David Oyelowo.  It is the story of the landmark civil rights case of Ossian Sweet. The screenplay was honoured by the Blacklist as one of the year's best-unproduced screenplays.

Barnes is also developing Atlanta's Most Wanted, a one-hour crime drama starring T.I., for the Fox Broadcasting Company and producer Jerry Bruckheimer and is attached to write and showrun Things That Make White People Uncomfortable, an anthology series based on the book of the same name, written by Dallas Cowboys defensive lineman Michael Bennett. He is also writing an untitled creature feature film to be directed by Jordan Roberts for New Regency.

Barnes is writing the novel "Crownsville." A tale of gothic horror to be published in the spring of 2019.

He is also the co-founder of Dark Apocrypha Productions, a production company based in Los Angeles, that creates both traditional and branded content projects. Formerly, he was a columnist for the Huffington Post. More recently, he signed a deal with HBO.

Awards
Barnes has received a Peabody Award for "The Return of the King" episode of The Boondocks, and the American Film Institute Award in 2007 for Everybody Hates Chris.

He has also been nominated for a BET Comedy Award for My Wife and Kids, the NAACP Image Award for The Boondocks, and the Writers Guild of America Award for Everybody Hates Chris and the 88th Academy Awards.

See also
List of Everybody Hates Chris episodes
List of The Boondocks episodes
List of My Wife and Kids episodes

References

External links
Rodney Barnes' Official Website

American television producers
American television writers
American male television writers
Living people
Year of birth missing (living people)
Howard University alumni
Writers from Annapolis, Maryland
Screenwriters from Maryland